Hello Mary Lou: Prom Night II is a 1987 Canadian supernatural slasher film directed by Bruce Pittman, and starring Michael Ironside, Wendy Lyon, Louis Ferreira, and Lisa Schrage. It follows a high school student who becomes possessed by Mary Lou Maloney, a student who died at her high school prom in 1957. A sequel to the slasher film Prom Night (1980), it was originally intended to be a standalone film titled The Haunting of Hamilton High, but was retitled in order to capitalize on the success of the original Prom Night. The only connection between the two films, that the high schools where the films are set have the same name, was a complete coincidence.

Filmed in Edmonton, Alberta in 1986, the film was retitled Hello Mary Lou: Prom Night II by its Canadian distributor, Alliance Films. It was released theatrically in the United States by The Samuel Goldwyn Company in October 1987, and grossed nearly $3 million at the U.S. box office. The film received mixed reviews from critics, with many drawing stylistic comparisons to various other films of the era, ranging from David Lynch's Blue Velvet to its horror contemporaries Carrie and A Nightmare on Elm Street.

The character Mary Lou Maloney would also appear in the next installment, Prom Night III: The Last Kiss (1990).

Plot
In 1957, seventeen-year-old Mary Lou Maloney confesses her various sins to a priest en route to her senior prom, which include having sexual relations with numerous boys. Before leaving, she defiantly tells the priest she "loved every minute of it." She arrives at the prom at Hamilton High School, which she attends with wealthy but unpopular Billy Nordham who gives her a ring with her initials on it. Shortly after receiving Billy's ring, Mary Lou sends him off to get punch while she sneaks backstage with Buddy Cooper, where the two are found making out by Billy. Storming off after Mary Lou claims she used him, Billy overhears two boys preparing a stink bomb and, when the boys abandon the bomb in the trash due to a teacher approaching, Billy grabs it. When Mary Lou is crowned prom queen, Billy, having snuck up onto the catwalk, drops the bomb on her before she is crowned. To the horror of Billy and everyone in attendance, the fuse of the bomb ignites Mary Lou's dress and she burns to death onstage, but not before looking up and seeing that Billy is the one responsible.

Thirty years later, student Vicki Carpenter goes looking for a prom dress in the school prop room after being denied a new dress by her overly religious mother. While searching, Vicki finds an old trunk containing Mary Lou's prom queen accessories and takes them, releasing Mary Lou's spirit in the process. After Vicki leaves Mary Lou's clothes in the art room after school, Vicki's friend Jess finds them and, after wedging a jewel out of the crown, is attacked by an unseen force and hung from a light by Mary Lou's cape. Jess's death is deemed a suicide caused by her despair over her recent discovery that she was pregnant.

After Jess's death, Vicki finds herself plagued by nightmarish hallucinations and confides in Buddy, who is now a priest. Buddy, after hearing Vicki's stories, believes Mary Lou may be back. Going to Mary Lou's grave, where his bible bursts into flames, Buddy afterwards tries to warn Billy, who is now the principal of Hamilton High and the father of Vicki's boyfriend Craig. During a detention caused by her slapping her rival Kelly Hennenlotter, Vicki is dragged into the classroom chalkboard, which turns to liquid.

Now fully possessed by Mary Lou, Vicki visits Buddy at the church and, revealing her identity to him, kills him by stabbing him in the face with a crucifix. Meanwhile, Vicki's new mannerisms and style of dress arouse the concern of Vicki's friend Monica. After confronting Vicki in the girls locker room, Monica is frightened into hiding from her in a locker, where she is crushed when Vicki makes the locker collapse in on her. After Monica's murder, Vicki seduces Craig and lures him away under the pretense of having sex, only to knock him unconscious and afterward confront and taunt Billy, revealing her identity to him. Finding the injured Craig, Billy takes him home and knocks him back out when Craig tries to go after Vicki. With Craig unconscious, Billy digs up Mary Lou's grave and finds the dead Buddy in the coffin. Meanwhile, Vicki's mother Virginia finds Vicki seducing her father, Walt. Horrified, she attempts to stop her from leaving for the prom, only to be telekinetically smashed through the front door.

Arriving at the prom, Vicki enjoys the festivities while Kelly, in order to become prom queen, fellates tally counter (and Monica's new boyfriend) Josh as a bribe. When Josh changes the outcome of the votes to make Kelly the winner, Vicki electrocutes Josh through his computer and changes the outcome. When she is crowned prom queen, Vicki goes up on stage, but is shot by Billy moments before getting her crown, to the horror of the crowd. Arriving after the shooting and approaching what appears to be the dying Vicki, Craig is knocked back when Vicki morphs into the charred corpse of Mary Lou. In the havoc, Kelly is stabbed and apparently killed by a falling light fixture and Craig is chased into the school prop room by Mary Lou, who opens a vortex to the Underworld that begins to suck Craig in. Before Craig is pulled through the gateway, Billy arrives and places the crown on Mary Lou and kisses her, apparently appeasing her spirit, which vanishes, releasing Vicki.

With Mary Lou gone, Vicki and Craig leave with Billy, getting into his car. When Billy turns on the radio, the Ronnie Hawkins 1959 hit song "Mary Lou" plays. Revealing he is wearing Mary Lou's ring and apparently possessed by Mary Lou, Billy drives off with the terrified Vicki and Craig.

Cast

Production
The film was originally titled The Haunting of Hamilton High, and includes many references and homages to past horror films in its script, including A Nightmare on Elm Street (1984), Carrie (1976) and The Exorcist (1973). In addition, several characters were named after popular horror film directors and other cult figures, including John Carpenter, George Romero, Wes Craven, Frank Henenlotter, Stephen King, John Waters, Edward D. Wood Jr. and Tod Browning.

The film was shot on location in Edmonton, Alberta at Westmount Jr. High School, on a budget of approximately CA$2.5 million. Other portions of the film were shot inside an abandoned furniture store. The Toronto-based Simcom Limited produced the film, while the media company Allarcom also co-funded its production. Filming began in early August 1986. The production chose Edmonton due to the local school board's enthusiasm about shooting a film in the city, as well as the fact that the local schools had the neo-Gothic architecture the producers had envisioned.

Jim Doyle, a special effects designer based in Los Angeles, served as the effects coordinator on the film. Doyle had previously worked on Wes Craven's A Nightmare on Elm Street (1984), and Francis Ford Coppola's One from the Heart (1982), and WarGames (1983). Some sequences required elaborate set-ups to film, such as the surrealistic sequence in which Vicki collapses into the chalkboard, which becomes a metallic liquid: Though only a 45-second sequence, the production crew scheduled five days to complete the scene, at an estimated cost of $2,000 per hour. Doyle designed the set with the blackboard lying flat on the floor, and filmed it so as to appear that it was standing on end.

Producer Peter Simpson and The Samuel Goldwyn Company reshot half of the film before it completed production, with writer Ron Oliver directing the new scenes himself. The film was subsequently rebranded as a sequel to the slasher Prom Night and retitled Hello Mary Lou: Prom Night II by its Canadian production company, Simcom, peripherally connecting the films. Simpson later stated that he felt branding the film a continuation of Prom Night damaged its reception.

Release
The film was released theatrically in October 1987, and later expanded to a wide release on November 13, 1987. It grossed $911,351 in its opening weekend, and ended up making $2,683,519 at the U.S. box office. The film was more of a success on home video.

Critical response

Contemporaneous

Kevin Thomas of the Los Angeles Times gave the film a positive review, praising Lyon's performance and drawing comparisons to Blue Velvet, adding: "You don't ... have to take Hello Mary Lou at all seriously, and it probably would be a mistake to do so. Certainly, it's not on the deeply personal, highly idiosyncratic artistic level of the David Lynch film, but it is a splendid example of what imagination can do with formula genre material." Vincent Canby of The New York Times described the film's extended "grand guignol" finale, writing: "Bruce Pittman, the director, and Ron Oliver, who wrote the screenplay, have constructed the movie as if it were a gourmet banquet for toddlers. From the first course to the last, it's all ice cream." Bill Cosford from The Arizona Republic called it "a badly made film, as awkward as can be, and long stretches of it make no sense whatsoever. Nor does it manage, as the better slasher films do, to re-create a high-school milieu of even passing authenticity."

Betsy Sherman of The Boston Globe deemed the film a "miserly slice-and-dicer: Carrie without the bucket of blood," though she conceded it is "somewhat livened by the presence of Michael Ironside." The Philadelphia Daily Newss Ben Yagoda panned the film, writing that it "can be credited with nothing other than providing temporary employment for a group of untalented individuals," and drawing comparisons between Peggy Sue Got Married (1986) and The Exorcist (1973). Richard Harrington of The Washington Post drew similar comparisons, writing that the film "may be derivative, but for the most part it's clever enough to trade on its sources with humor and class. It's Peggy Sue Lives on Elm Street, with dollops of Carrie, The Exorcist and a half dozen other genre stalwarts."

Stephen Hunter of The Baltimore Sun criticized what he described as a "rudimentary" script as well as the "waste" of Ironside. The Atlanta Constitutions Eleanor Ringel wrote: "for all its rip-offs, Hello Mary Lou is never a total chore to sit through. As vengeance-minded females go, Ms. Schrage makes Glenn Close in Fatal Attraction come off like a Girl Scout leader," adding that it serves as a "black-comic commentary on the whole notion of prom queens." Juan Carlos Coto of the South Florida Sun-Sentinel reviewed the film favorably, writing that "despite its lack of original material, this film is well-scripted, directed, and actedand surprisingly entertaining." A review in TV Guide awarded the film one out of five stars, praising the special effects and Pittman's direction, but ultimately deemed the film "all too predictable."

Modern assessment

On the review aggregator website Rotten Tomatoes, Hello Mary Lou: Prom Night II holds a 59% approval rating based on 17 critic reviews, with an average rating of 5.30/10.

In a retrospective assessment, film scholar and critic John Kenneth Muir wrote, "In the annals of unnecessary sequels, Hello Mary Lou: Prom Night II rates high. Contrarily, in the ranks of 1980s horror movies, it's merely a mediocre effort." Film scholar Mike Mayo said the film is only a Prom Night sequel by title, and that it in fact bears more similarity to A Nightmare on Elm Street (1984). Writing for Syfy in 2017, Rebecca Pahle praised the film's special effects and acting, and deemed it a "slasher masterwork." Jacob Knight of ComingSoon.net similarly praised the film in a 2015 retrospective, writing: "It’s a shame Hello Mary Lou never became a bigger hit, because it’s an oft-forgotten gem of the horror genre, standing the test of time nearly thirty years on. An amalgamation of national tax shelter weirdness, brazen borrowing from better films, and the tossing of creative caution to the wind, Pittman’s picture evokes numerous classics while indubitably carving its own identity."

Home media
Virgin Vision released the film on VHS in May 1988.

As a tie-in for the release of the 2008 remake of Prom Night, MGM Home Entertainment (distributed by 20th Century Fox Home Entertainment) released a new widescreen DVD of Hello Mary Lou on April 1, 2008. The film had earlier been released in Canada in 2003 as a full-screen DVD from Alliance Atlantis, who has since regained rights to release Hello Mary Lou: Prom Night II again, as part of a 5 horror movie collection DVD set from Echo Bridge Home Entertainment in 2013.

References

Sources

External links
 
 
 

Prom Night (film series)
1987 films
1987 horror films
1987 independent films
1980s Canadian films
1980s English-language films
1980s ghost films
1980s high school films
1980s slasher films
1980s supernatural horror films
1980s teen horror films
Canadian ghost films
Canadian high school films
Canadian independent films
Canadian slasher films
Canadian supernatural horror films
English-language Canadian films
Films about pranks
Films about proms
Films directed by Bruce Pittman
Films scored by Paul Zaza
Films set in 1957
Films set in 1987
Films shot in Edmonton
Supernatural slasher films